The Christian Flag is an ecumenical flag designed in the early 20th century to represent much of Christianity and Christendom. Since its adoption by the United States Federal Council of Churches in 1942, it has been used by congregations of many Christian traditions, including Anglican, Baptist, Congregationalist, Lutheran, Mennonite, Methodist, Moravian, Presbyterian, and Reformed, among others.

The flag has a white field, with a red Latin cross inside a blue canton.  The shade of red on the cross symbolizes the blood that Jesus shed on Calvary. The blue represents the waters of baptism as well as the faithfulness of Jesus. The white represents Jesus' purity. The dimensions of the flag and canton have no official specifications.

Origins

The Christian Flag was first conceived on September 26, 1897, at Brighton Chapel on Coney Island in Brooklyn, New York in the United States.  The superintendent of a Sunday school, Charles C. Overton, gave an impromptu lecture to the gathered students, because the scheduled speaker had failed to arrive for the event. He gave a speech asking the students what a flag representing Christianity would look like. Overton thought about his improvised speech for many years afterward. In 1907, he and Ralph Diffendorfer, secretary of the Methodist Young People's Missionary Movement, designed and began promoting the flag. With regard to the Christian symbolism of the Christian Flag:

The ecumenical organization, Federal Council of Churches (now succeeded by the National Council of Churches and Christian Churches Together) adopted the flag on 23 January 1942, 45 years after unofficial use since 1897; the Federal Council of Churches represented Baptist, Brethren, Eastern Orthodox, Episcopal, Methodist, Moravian, Lutheran, Oriental Orthodox, Polish National Catholic, Presbyterian, Quaker, and Reformed traditions, among others. The Christian Flag intentionally has had no copyright or trademark rights connected to it, as the designer freely dedicated the flag to all of Christendom. Fanny Crosby wrote the words to a hymn called "The Christian Flag" with music by R. Huntington Woodman. Like the flag, the hymn is free use. On the Sunday nearest September 26, 1997, the Christian Flag celebrated its one hundredth anniversary.

Usage

Mainline Protestant denominations in the United States accepted the flag first, and by the 1980s many institutions had described policies for displaying it inside churches.  The Federal Council of Churches recommended that if the Christian Flag is to be used alongside a national flag, that the Christian Flag should receive the place of honor. During World War II the flag was flown along with the U.S. flag in a number of Lutheran churches, many of them with German backgrounds, who wanted to show their solidarity with the United States during the war against Nazi Germany.

The Christian Flag spread outside North America with Christian missionaries. It can be seen today in or outside many Christian churches throughout the world, particularly in Latin America and in Africa. By the 1930s the flag had been adopted by some Protestant churches in Europe, Asia, and Africa as well. 

The Christian Flag is not patented and therefore, "Anyone may manufacture it, and it may be used on all proper occasions."

In U.S. evangelical Christian schools, it is customary for the Christian flag to be displayed opposite the U.S. flag.

In Canada and the United States, accommodationists and separationists have entered impassioned debate on the legality of erecting the Christian Flag atop governmental buildings.

Pledge
Some churches and organizations practice a "pledge of allegiance" or "affirmation of loyalty" to the Christian Flag, which is similar to the Pledge of Allegiance to the U.S. flag.  The first pledge was written by Lynn Harold Hough, a Methodist minister who had heard Ralph Diffendorfer, secretary to the Methodist Young People's Missionary Movement, promoting the Christian flag at a rally.  He wrote the following pledge:

Some more conservative evangelical, Lutheran, Adventist, and Baptist churches and schools may use an alternative version of the pledge: 

An alternate version that some Lutheran schools use is this:

Others use this version:

For the Christian Flag Pledge, it is customary to stand with the hands clasped behind the back, as if in an "at ease" military stance.

Anthem

See also
 American civil religion
 Black Standard	
 Christian nationalism
 Christian symbolism
 Civil religion
 Cross necklace
 Flag of Israel
 Flag of Vatican City
 Head of Christ
 History of Christian flags
 Islamic flags
 Nordic cross flag

References

Further reading

External links
 
 
 
 
 

Christian symbols
Protestant ecumenism
Religious flags
Flags with crosses
Flags introduced in 1907